Coleophora biminimmaculella is a moth of the family Coleophoridae. It is found in the United States, including Texas.

References

biminimmaculella
Moths described in 1878
Moths of North America